Heo Beom-San  (born 14 September 1989) is a South Korean footballer who plays as a midfielder for Seoul E-Land FC in the K League 2.

Club career statistics

External links 
 

1989 births
Living people
Footballers from Seoul
Association football midfielders
South Korean footballers
Daejeon Hana Citizen FC players
Jeju United FC players
Gangwon FC players
Asan Mugunghwa FC players
Seoul E-Land FC players
K League 1 players
K League 2 players